Jacqueline Rose "Jacqui" Freney  (born 6 June 1992) is an Australian Paralympic swimmer. At the 2012 London Games, she broke Siobhan Paton's Australian record of six gold medals at a single Games by winning her seventh gold medal in the Women's 400 m Freestyle S7. She finished the Games with eight gold medals, more than any other participant in the Games.

Biography

Jacqueline Rose Freney was born in Brisbane, Queensland with cerebral palsy diplegia. She won three bronze medals at the 2008 Beijing Games in the women's 100m freestyle S8 event, 400m freestyle S8 event and 50m freestyle S8 event. In 2012 at the London Paralympic Games she won 8 gold medals in the women's 100m backstroke S7, women's 50m butterfly S7, 100m freestyle S7, 400m freestyle S7, 50m freestyle S7, 200m individual medley SM7, 4 × 100 m freestyle relay 34 pts, and the  medleyrelay event. She broke Siobhan Paton's Australian record of six gold medals at a single Games by winning her seventh gold medal in the Women's 400 m Freestyle S7. In breaking the record she said "Seven, I am in heaven". She finished the Games with eight gold medals, more than any other participant in the games.

Freney lives in Skenners Head, Ballina, New South Wales, and is coached by her father Michael. Her grandfather Peter Freney coached 2000 Sydney Games multiple gold medallist Siobhan Paton. Freney's grandfather now assists in her career development. In 2008, she was awarded an Australian Institute of Sport paralympic swimming scholarship.

At the 2010 IPC Swimming World Championships in Eindhoven, Netherlands, she won silver medals in the women's 100m freestyle and 400m freestyle events S8 events. In 2011, a week before the Can-Am Swimming Open, Freney was reclassified from S8 to S7. At the 2011 Can-Am Swimming Open in La Mirada, she set a world record in the S7 400m freestyle event twice, once during the heats and again during the finals with a time of 4:59.95 on her way to winning a gold medal. At the Can-Am Swimming Open, she won two silver medals in the S7 50m and 100m freestyle events.

Freney was unable to compete at the 2016 Summer Paralympic Games in Rio de Janeiro due to a medical issue. Freney had been suffering from electromagnetic sensations triggered by strenuous training and was unable to find an answer as to why this issue occurred.

Recognition
 

In February 2012 Freney was named Ballina Shire's Sportsperson of the Year. She was a finalist for the 2012 Australian Paralympian of the Year, and won both best female and the top overall honour. In 2012, Freney was declared Paralympian of the Year by Australia Post and this achievement was celebrated with the release of a commemorative stamp which featured the inspirational athlete. In November 2013 she was named New South Wales Young Australian of the Year for 2014. On 25 January 2014 she was named Young Australian of the Year. The following day she was also awarded a Medal of the Order of Australia "For service to sport as a gold medallist at the London 2012 Paralympic Games". In October 2014 she was inducted into the Path of Champions at the Sydney Olympic Park Aquatic Centre.

Freney earned her Young Australian of the Year award in 2014 by being actively involved in the community, working with Swimming Australia as a motivational speaker to help people with disabilities to reach their true potential.

References

External links 

 

 
 
 

Female Paralympic swimmers of Australia
Swimmers at the 2008 Summer Paralympics
Swimmers at the 2012 Summer Paralympics
Paralympic gold medalists for Australia
Paralympic bronze medalists for Australia
Australian Institute of Sport Paralympic swimmers
Cerebral Palsy category Paralympic competitors
Australian female backstroke swimmers
Australian female butterfly swimmers
Australian female freestyle swimmers
Australian female medley swimmers
World record holders in paralympic swimming
1992 births
Living people
Sportswomen from Queensland
Recipients of the Medal of the Order of Australia
Medalists at the 2008 Summer Paralympics
Medalists at the 2012 Summer Paralympics
Swimmers from Brisbane
S7-classified Paralympic swimmers
Medalists at the World Para Swimming Championships
Paralympic medalists in swimming
21st-century Australian women